Hatkanangale railway station is a major railway station in Kolhapur district, Maharashtra. Its code is HTK. It serves Hatkanangale city and is also the nearest railway station for the city of Ichalkaranji, 7 km away. The station consists of two platforms. The platforms are not well sheltered. It lacks many facilities including water and sanitation.

Trains 

Some of the trains that run through the station are:

 Haripriya Express
 Koyna Express
 Mahalaxmi Express
 Maharashtra Express
 Rani Chennamma Express
 Sahyadri Express
 CSMT Kolhapur–Gorakhpur Link Express
 Hyderabad–CSMT Kolhapur Express

References

Railway stations in Kolhapur district
Pune railway division